Reach Sambath (17 July 196411 May 2011) was a Cambodian journalist and a former spokesperson and Chief of Public Affairs of the Extraordinary Chambers in the Courts of Cambodia (ECCC), commonly known as the Khmer Rouge Tribunal, set up to try the most senior Khmer Rouge leaders from 1975 to 1979. Sambath had a master's degree in journalism from Columbia University, New York, and a career as a university lecturer at the Royal University of Phnom Penh and a reporter in Cambodia with Agence France-Presse since the 1990s.

Biography

Early life
Sambath was born in Svay Rieng, Cambodia. His father was a district governor there. In 1975, at the age of 10, he lost his father and later lost his mother and three of his four brothers to the Khmer Rouge's Killing Fields. For years, he searched for any scrap of memory of his lost family, eventually retrieving an old picture of his father from a family friend taken when he was a monk for a short-time in a Buddhist pagoda. After the Khmer Rouge period, he eked out a living as a roadside ice seller and a bike taxi-driver from 1981 to 1984 to support his studies.

He attended Wat Phnom Primary School, and graduated from Sisowath High School or Lycée Sisowath, one of the most famous high schools, in 1987. In 1984, because of some English knowledge he acquired in school, he became an English teacher. During his toughest times living as an orphan, Reach Sambath stayed at a pagoda as a pagoda boy, and received support from relatives and people around him.

1980s: Education

After graduation from high school, he was one of the first students after the Khmer Rouge reign to receive a scholarship to study agriculture in India. After the election organized by the United Nations Transitional Authority in Cambodia in 1993, Sambath pursued his studies in the field of journalism at Chulalongkorn University. He would later receive his master's degree from Columbia University Graduate School of Journalism, while on leave from Agence France-Presse.

Careers

As a journalist 
After studying a bachelor's degree in agriculture in India from 1988 to 1991, Sambath returned to Cambodia and worked as a reporter for Agence-France Presse (AFP), a French news agency based in Cambodia in 1991. He worked there until 2002. In an interview with RFI, Sambath said that he did not have a strong like for his agriculture courses, but instead developed an unexpected interest in the press while he was studying in India. He was probably one of the first Cambodians to work for a foreign news agency, and he covered the nation's first post-regime election, a coup, an ongoing civil war and finally the collapse of the Khmer Rouge insurgency as well as the death of Pol Pot. He also worked as a reporter and translator for The New York Times of which the international edition is the International Herald Tribune.

As a journalism lecturer
Sambath became a journalism trainer in 1997. Since 2003, he taught journalism at the Department of Media and Communication (RUPP), the first and only journalism school at the Royal University of Phnom Penh, something he had continued to do after he joined the tribunal staff in 2006.

As spokesman at the Khmer Rouge Tribunal
In February 2006, Sambath became a Cambodian spokesman at the Extraordinary Chambers in the Courts of Cambodia (ECCC). He was also regarded by the victims of the Khmer Rouge regime as "spokesperson for the ghosts." Then, in June 2009, he was promoted to be Chief of Public Affairs of the ECCC.

As spokesman for the UN-backed genocide tribunal, his work involved answering the local and international press, and his latest work included outreach to some 4,000 students in Battambang Province over the workings of the Khmer Rouge Tribunal, the government and UN roles within it. Before he died, Sambath gave an interview to PBS NewsHour, saying: "My children didn’t know what happened to my parents, their grandparents. So, through the trial Case 002, we believe that a lot of people at their age will be able to learn more about what happened in the past."

Death
He fell in his office on Tuesday, suffering from an apparent major stroke from high blood pressure, and died on 11 May 2011, at the age of 47, at the Calmette Hospital in Phnom Penh, Cambodia. His death was called "a great loss, a big loss for the human resource of the nation" by the acting director of the journalism school.

Achievements
In recognition of his contributions to the nation, the Royal Government of Cambodia awarded Sambath the “Mony Saraphoan” medal at the “Maha Sereivann” grade on May 12, 2011. Previously, in 2000, he received an award from the US-based Human Rights Watch for his life story before and after the Khmer Rouge regime.

See also

 Vann Nath
 Tuol Sleng
 Chum Mey
 Torture
 John Dawson Dewhirst
 Comrade Duch
 Luke Hunt

Notes

External links 

The Extraordinary Chambers in the Courts of Cambodia – Official site
United Nations Assistance to the Khmer Rouge Trials – Official site
Department of Media & Communication – Official site
Royal University of Phnom Penh – Official site

1964 births
2011 deaths
Academic staff of Royal University of Phnom Penh
Cambodian journalists
Agence France-Presse journalists
Columbia University Graduate School of Journalism alumni
People from Svay Rieng province